Cerros de Incahuasi is a mountain with several summits located in the Antofagasta Region of Chile, near Sico Pass. The present–day mountain is the result of the partial collapse of an ancient
volcanic edifice.

The Incahuasi Sur volcano in this range was active 10.5 million years ago. It is associated with a volcanic belt and fault that extends southeastward from Incahuasi Sur, the Calama–Olacapato–El Toro fault.

See also
Caichinque
Cerro Miscanti
Miñiques

References

Landforms of Antofagasta Region
Mountains of Chile
Five-thousanders of the Andes
Stratovolcanoes of Chile
Pleistocene stratovolcanoes